Carnosaur 3: Primal Species is a 1996 direct-to-video science fiction horror film. It is the sequel to the 1995 film Carnosaur 2, and is currently the final installment of the Carnosaur series. It stars Scott Valentine, Janet Gunn, Rick Dean, Rodger Halston and Anthony Peck. The film follows a military team as they try to capture several genetically reconstructed dinosaurs. It received negative reviews.

Plot
In the opening sequence, an army convoy is attacked by terrorists who soon discover they have stolen a truck of living frozen biological material instead of uranium. Once at a dockside warehouse, two frozen Velociraptors and a Tyrannosaurus rex escape and kill many of the terrorists before the police arrive, who expect to find drug smugglers. After finding the sole survivor, the police are killed inside the warehouse by the Velociraptors. An anti-terrorist special force led by Colonel Rance Higgins is called in by General Mercer where they find pieces of bodies and a refrigeration truck rather than uranium. They maneuver through warehouse boxes until two get slashed to death.

The survivors learn from Dr. Hodges that these dinosaurs were genetically reconstructed and are now the last three "carnosaurs" left in existence. The dinosaurs had been en route to a government research facility, and it is made clear that they need to be caught alive, relating to the potential for curing major diseases. A massive meat shipment resides at the dock, so the three remaining soldiers hunt in that area, meeting up with a unit of Marines who have come as backup. Soldier Polchek is given drugs to shoot into the carnosaurs as the group set up a lure and net trap with meat. One of the Velociraptors attacks and almost succeeds in dragging off Polchek, but is shot down.

The raptor is taken to the base for examination. Hodges soon theorizes that the asexual T. rex is breeding since Polchek was being dragged off, perhaps to hatchlings. The injured Velociraptor awakens and begins to attack. The T. rex also appears and bites off a soldier's head before escaping with the Velociraptor to an agricultural transport ship. With Marine member Rossi as captain, the team decides to move the ship out to sea and to use its refrigeration coolant to freeze the dinosaurs.

When time comes to explore the lower decks of the ship, the carnosaurs knock out the lights and kill a couple more soldiers. The survivors get to an elevator, but a Velociraptor chews the cable through and they crash on the bottom level. There, the team discover the nest of eggs and begin shooting it, angering the T. rex, who soon bites off Polchek's arm and then eats him. The survivors decide to kill the dinosaurs, by blowing up the ship with dynamite.

The T. rex bursts through the ceiling and drags Rossi through it before eating him. The two Velociraptors are shot to death after one of them kills Marine member Proudfoot. Hodges senses the T. rex is close. She and Rance hide behind lockers which the T. rex head-butts. Rance throws an explosive in the mouth of the dinosaur, killing it. The two race against time to jump in the ocean before the ship explodes. Back in a police car at the port, the sole surviving terrorist is still bound and gagged in the back seat when a Velociraptor soon appears outside the vehicle and eats him, foreshadowing that the prehistoric terror is not over yet.

Cast
 Scott Valentine as Colonel Rance Higgins
 Janet Gunn as Dr. Hodges
 Rick Dean as Polchek
 Rodger Halston as Sanders
 Anthony Peck as General Pete Mercer
 Terri J. Vaughn as B.T. Coolidge
 Billy Burnette as Lieutenant Furguson
 Morgan Englund as Rossi
 Stephen Lee as Sergeant
 David Roberson as Johnson
 Justina Vail as Proudfoot
 Cyril O'Reilly as Dolan
Abraham Gordon as Officer Billings
 Michael James McDonald as Officer Wilson
 Jonathan Winfrey as Bob

Production and release
Carnosaur 3: Primal Species was made on a smaller budget than its predecessors. A 60-pound rubber creature suit was utilized to portray some of the dinosaurs. Cast member Justina Vail said about the production: "A lot of it made me laugh. It looked like there was a guy in a dinosaur costume running across the room. So it was a challenge to get to the real reality part of it, but ultimately it was a blast". The cast includes actor Rick Dean, who had previously played a different character in Carnosaur 2.

The film premiered on video in November 1996. It was released on DVD on April 18, 2000.

Reception
Fangoria was critical of the film and stated that it was lacking in "originality, taste, logic" and realism, but wrote about the dinosaurs: "Seen in quick cuts or by the light of flickering bulbs, the Carnosaurs themselves are still somewhat effective; in fact, they're the only good thing in Carnosaur 3". Randy Myers, writing for Knight-Ridder Newspapers, was critical of the dinosaur effects and the casting of Valentine in the lead role. J.R. Taylor of Entertainment Weekly rated it a "D" and wrote that "the rambling story doesn't show half the wit of the closing credits, in which a disclaimer assures that no dinosaurs were harmed during the making of this film".

TV Guide wrote that director Jonathan Winfrey "does demonstrate some aptitude for creative camerawork and editing transitions", but still called the film a "slack, unscary exercise", rating it one star out of four. TV Guide was critical of the script, the dinosaur effects, and the "one-dimensional" characters and acting. Brian J. Dillard of AllMovie found the film to be boring and repetitive, rating it one and a half stars out of five. Dillard wrote that the film reduced the Carnosaur series to "its most basic elements -- interchangeable soldiers being chased by interchangeable rubber dinosaurs".

Riley Black, writing for Smithsonian in 2009, included Carnosaur 3 on her list of the five worst dinosaur films ever made. Regarding the premise of dinosaurs against the military, Black wrote that the filmmakers "somehow managed to make it boring". Critic Mike Mayo wrote in 2013: "Even though the setting is your basic empty-warehouse industrial park, the whole film is arguably no sillier or more poorly plotted than Jurassic Park: The Lost World, but with much less impressive effects".

References

External links
 
 
 

1996 direct-to-video films
1990s action films
1996 horror films
1996 films
1990s monster movies
1990s science fiction horror films
Direct-to-video horror films
Direct-to-video sequel films
Films about dinosaurs
Films about genetic engineering
Films about the United States Marine Corps
Films about terrorism
Films produced by Roger Corman
Films scored by Kevin Kiner
American monster movies
American splatter films
Films directed by Jonathan Winfrey
1990s English-language films
1990s American films